Sangeetha Kalanidhi or Sangeeta Kalanidhi or Sangita Kalanidhi (Tamil: சங்கீத  கலாநிதி, Sanskrit : संगीत-कलानिधि) (sangeetha = music, kala = art, nidhi = treasure or ocean) is the title awarded yearly to a Carnatic musician by the Madras Music Academy.

From 1929 to 1941, the award did not exist. The idea of the award was conceived in 1942 by the then Academy President KV Krishnaswami Iyer; and on 1 January 1943, all musicians who had presided over the annual conferences between 1929 and 1942 were awarded the title. This included 2 or 3 past presidents - Palamarneri Swaminatha Iyer (1931), probably Umayalpuram Swaminatha Iyer (1936) and Mangudi Chidambara Bhagavatar (1937) - who were no more, but no posthumous award has been presented since then. Some sources cite 1946 as the year of death for Umayalpuram Swaminatha Iyer, in which case he might have received Sangeet Kalanighi award in his lifetime only.

Sangeetha Kalanidhis
Source(s):

See also 

 Madras Music Academy

References

External links
  

Indian music awards

Carnatic music
Awards established in 1929
1926 establishments in India